Dalbeattie High School is a small rural secondary school on the edge of Dalbeattie in the historical county of Kirkcudbrightshire in the local council area of Dumfries and Galloway in Scotland. The school has 380 pupils, with 40 staff.

The original school was built between 1950 and 1958 by the Kirkcudbrightshire County architect Archibald Thomson Caldwell and has been replaced by a new build which was officially opened in August 2018. Combined with the relocated primary it forms the Dalbeattie Learning Campus.

References

External links
Official website

Educational institutions with year of establishment missing
Secondary schools in Dumfries and Galloway
Dalbeattie